Gilbert fitzBaderon of Monmouth (died about 1189) was one of the two sons of Baderon fitzWilliam by his wife Rohese de Clare. When Baderon died, at some date between 1170 and 1176, Gilbert succeeded him as lord of Monmouth and holder of Monmouth Castle. Gilbert is best known as a patron of literature and it was under Gilbert's patronage that the poet Hue de Rotelande wrote his verse romance Ipomedon, which was among the most popular works in its genre in medieval England. The original text in Anglo-Norman (a variant of Old French spoken and written in Norman England and Wales) was translated at least three times into Middle English under the variant title Ipomadon. Hue de Rotelande afterwards wrote a sequel, Protheselaus, which he dedicated to his patron Gilbert fitzBaderon.

Around 1170 Gilbert acted as witness when his sister Rohese of Monmouth and his brother-in-law Hugh de Lacy, Lord of Meath, made a donation to Monmouth Priory. On his death Gilbert was succeeded as lord of Monmouth by John of Monmouth.

References

Sources

Further reading 
 Keith Kissack, Mediaeval Monmouth (Monmouth: Monmouth Historical and Educational Trust, 1974)
 André de Mandach, Naissance et développement de la chanson de geste en Europe, IV: Chanson d'Aspremont (Geneva: Droz, 1980) pp. 18–27 Selected pages at Google Books

Anglo-Normans in Wales
People from Monmouth, Wales
Patrons of literature
1180s deaths
Year of birth unknown